The U.S. Post Office–Blackfoot Main, also known as Blackfoot Main Post Office, in Blackfoot, Idaho was built in 1936.  It was listed on the National Register of Historic Places in 1989.  It has Moderne architecture.

It was designed by  Gilbert Stanley Underwood.

The interior includes a five-panel mural titled The Arrival Celebration. It was painted in 1939 by Anthony Standing Soldier, a young Sioux Indian artist from Pine Ridge, South Dakota, for $2,000.

See also 
List of United States post offices

References

External links

Post office buildings on the National Register of Historic Places in Idaho
Government buildings completed in 1936
Buildings and structures in Bingham County, Idaho
Post office buildings in Idaho
National Register of Historic Places in Bingham County, Idaho
Blackfoot, Idaho